House Arrest is a 2019 Indian comedy film directed by Samit Basu and Shashanka Ghosh and written by Samit Basu. It released on 15 November 2019 through Netflix.

Plot

In this comedy of errors, a betrayed man on voluntary self-confinement faces the simultaneous arrival of a peculiar package, and a curious journalist.

After being betrayed by his wife, Karan quits his regular job and locks himself in. He only receives daily groceries via the neighbourhood caretaker. Even stepping out induces extreme anxiety within him.

One evening, a neighbour, Pinky, drops off a packaged cabinet at his place and asks him to take care of it. He later discovers it's something deadly. At the same time, a young journalist who has heard of his isolation comes to interview him. They hit it off while he constantly tries to keep her from seeing the package.

Trouble ensues when the neighbour, the package, the journalist, everything comes crashing down all at once.

Cast
 Ali Fazal as Karan, a man in a self-imposed house arrest
 Shriya Pilgaonkar as Saira, the journalist 
 Jim Sarbh as Jamshed Daneja (JD), Karan's best friend 
 Barkha Singh as Pinky, Karan's friend who gives him a package for safekeeping
 Sunil Kumar as Rambo, Pinky's bodyguard

References

External links
 
 

2010s Hindi-language films
Indian comedy films
Hindi-language Netflix original films
2019 films
Indian direct-to-video films
2019 direct-to-video films
2019 comedy films